Nicrophorus dauricus is a burying beetle described by Victor Motschulsky, a Russian entomologist, in 1860.

References

Silphidae
Beetles of North America
Beetles described in 1860
Taxa named by Victor Motschulsky